South Armagh may refer to:

The southern part of County Armagh
South Armagh (Northern Ireland Parliament constituency)
South Armagh (UK Parliament constituency)
Provisional IRA South Armagh Brigade